Stanislav Viliorovich Osadchiy (Russian: Станислав Вилиорович Осадчий; born 26 January 1951) is a diplomat who has served as Ambassador Extraordinary and Plenipotentiary of the Russian Federation to Austria, and to the Republic of Cyprus.

Biography 
Osadchiy graduated from the Moscow State Institute of International Relations in 1973 and went on to work in various diplomatic posts in the central offices of the Ministry of Foreign Affairs and abroad.

From 1997 to 1999, Osadchiy was the consul-general of Russia in Hamburg, Germany, and from 1999 to 2000 the consul-general of Russia in Istanbul, Turkey.

On 6 August 2004, he was appointed by Vladimir Putin as Ambassador of Russia to Austria, and he presented his credentials in Vienna on 14 September 2004.

Osadchiy speaks Russian, English, French, Greek, German and Turkish.

References 

1951 births
Living people
Moscow State Institute of International Relations alumni
Ambassador Extraordinary and Plenipotentiary (Russian Federation)
Ambassadors of Russia to Austria
Ambassadors of Russia to Cyprus